Juhana Tuomas Toiviainen (31 May 1879, Pyhäjärvi Vpl – 7 June 1937) was a Finnish politician. He was a Member of the Parliament of Finland from 1920 to 1922, representing the National Progressive Party.

References

1879 births
1937 deaths
People from Priozersky District
People from Viipuri Province (Grand Duchy of Finland)
National Progressive Party (Finland) politicians
Members of the Parliament of Finland (1919–22)
University of Helsinki alumni